The 2016 GP Miguel Induráin was the 63rd edition of the GP Miguel Induráin cycle race and was held on 2 April 2016. The race started and finished in Estella. The race was won by Ion Izagirre.

General classification

References

2016
2016 UCI Europe Tour
2016 in Spanish road cycling